Arabis aculeolata is a species of flowering plant in the mustard family known by the common name Waldo rockcress. It is native to a small range in the mountains of southern Oregon, where it is an uncommon member of the serpentine soils flora. Reports of its occurrence in Del Norte County, California are unconfirmed.

Description 
This is a perennial herb growing from a tough caudex covered in large hairs and the bases of leaves shed in previous seasons. It produces one or more erect stems to heights between 20 and 35 centimeters. The stems are dark in color, often reddish or purplish, and are coated in stiff white hairs. The leaves form a basal rosette about the caudex. They are oval-shaped, green in color and sparsely covered in coarse white hairs, up to 4 centimeters long, and with smooth or wavy edges. Leaves located farther up the stem are smaller. The flowers have dark purple sepals and lighter purple petals. The fruit is a long, thin, erect silique up to 6.5 centimeters long.

See also 

 List of Arabis species

External links

Jepson Manual Treatment
USDA Plants Profile
Photo gallery

aculeolata
Flora of California
Flora of Oregon
Plants described in 1910
Flora without expected TNC conservation status